Marinobacterium lutimaris  is a Gram-negative and moderately halophilic bacterium from the genus of Marinobacterium which has been isolated from tidal flat from the coast of Taean in Korea.

References

 

Alteromonadales
Bacteria described in 2010